The Allegheny Highlands Trail of Maryland (AHTM) is a  long rail trail between the C&O Canal in Cumberland and the Mason–Dixon line, where it meets the Allegheny Highlands Trail of Pennsylvania. It forms part of the Pittsburgh–Washington, DC Great Allegheny Passage.

The trail follows the route of the Connellsville extension of the Western Maryland Railway. Track still parallels the trail between Cumberland and Frostburg; it is used by the Western Maryland Scenic Railroad.

See also
Allegheny Trail, West Virginia

References

External links
Allegheny Highlands Trail Maryland
Allegheny Highlands Trail of Maryland page at RailsToTrails.us

Rail trails in Maryland
Protected areas of Allegany County, Maryland
Parks in Cumberland, MD-WV-PA
Tourist attractions in Cumberland, MD-WV-PA
Transportation in Allegany County, Maryland